Antonio Loprieno (born 1955 in Bari) is a Swiss Italian Egyptologist and Professor of History of Institutions at the University of Basel. From 2005 to 2015, he was rector of the University of Basel. He was also president of the Rectors’ Conference of the Swiss Universities (CRUS) from 2008 to 2015. Since 2018, he has been president of ALLEA, the European Federation of Academies of Sciences and Humanities, and of the Swiss Academies of Arts and Sciences. From December 2019 to December 2020, he was president of the Jacobs University Bremen.

Biography 
Loprieno graduated from the European School, Brussels I, obtaining his European Baccalaureate in 1972. He then studied Egyptology, Linguistics and Semitic Studies at the University of Turin, where he received his doctorate in 1977 and worked until 1981 as a research assistant. He then went to the University of Göttingen with a scholarship from the Alexander von Humboldt Foundation and habilitated in 1984. From 1983 to 1986 he was a lecturer at the University of Perugia, and from 1984 to 1987 at the University of Göttingen.

In 1987, Loprieno was appointed associate professor of Afroasiatic linguistics at the University of Perugia. In 1989, he became full professor of Egyptology at the University of California Los Angeles (UCLA), where he headed the Department of Near Eastern Languages and Cultures from 1991 to 2000. During this time, he was also a visiting professor at the Hebrew University of Jerusalem, at the École Pratique des Hautes Études in Paris and at Heidelberg University.

In 2000, Loprieno became a full professor of Egyptology at the University of Basel, and in July 2005, he was elected rector of the University. He stepped down from his position as rector on 31 July 2015 and returned to research and teaching in Egyptology, history of institutions and academic management.

In May 2018, Loprieno assumed the presidency of the Swiss Academies of Arts and Sciences and took up the post of president of ALLEA, the European Federation of Academies of Sciences and Humanities. In April 2018, he was elected chairman of the Board of Governors of Jacobs University Bremen. On November 12, 2019, Jacobs University announced that after the resignation of Michael Hülsmann and following the proposal of the search committee under Lavinia Jacobs, Loprieno will change into the role of president effective December 1, 2019.

Loprieno is member of the Accademia delle Scienze di Torino, corresponding member of the Göttingen Academy of Sciences and Humanities, of the German Archaeological Institute and other internationally renowned scientific societies. He is also co-editor of the Journal of Egyptian Language and Ancient Studies (ZÄS) and of Lingua Aegyptia — Journal of Egyptian Language Studies (LingAeg).

Loprieno is also honorary president of the church council of the Basel Chiesa evangelica di lingua italiana (Waldensians).

Selected publications 

Das Verbalsystem im Ägyptischen und im Semitischen, Harrassowitz, 1986
Topos und Mimesis, Harrassowitz, 1986
Ancient Egyptian - a linguistic introduction, Cambridge University Press, 1995
Ancient Egyptian literature: history and forms, Brill, 1996
La pensée et l'écriture: pour une analyse sémiotique de la culture égyptienne, Cybèle, 2012
Vom Schriftbild, Schwabe Verlag, 2007
 Slavery and servitude, UCLA Encyclopedia of Egyptology, 2012,
The Ancient Egyptian Language, Cambridge University Press, 2013
Die entzauberte Universität, Passagen 2016

References

External links 
CV

Academic staff of the University of Göttingen
Living people
Alumni of the European Schools
Academic staff of the University of Basel
University of Turin alumni
University of Göttingen alumni
Academic staff of the University of Perugia
University of California, Los Angeles faculty
Swiss Egyptologists
Italian Egyptologists
Academic journal editors
Swiss expatriates in the United States
Italian expatriates in the United States
People from Bari
Swiss expatriates in West Germany
Italian expatriates in West Germany
Rectors of universities in Switzerland
1955 births
People of Apulian descent